Humming Moon Drip is the first studio album by the electronic band Olaibi. It was released in 2006 on Polystar Co., Ltd..

Track listing

 Owl tree - (0:26)
 tower - (2:42)
 tuk tuk - (2:17)
 太陽 - (5:56)
 ルーサンダ - (1:32)
 ワハタン - (5:02)
 NGOMA - (1:49)
 Humming moon - (14:20)
 taw bi da fay weuy - (9:32)
 imbawimbo - (1:24)
 ioenami - (7:16)

Personnel

 OLAibi
 Yoshimi P-We
 Ai

External links
OLAibi home page

2006 albums
Olaibi albums